Rohini Khadse-Khewalkar is an Indian politician. She is a woman leader of Jalgaon District Nationalist Congress Party. She is also the Chairman of Jalgaon District Central Co-operative Bank. She is the daughter of Eknath Khadse.

Positions held
 2015 to 2021 - President of Jalgaon District Central Cooperative Bank.
 2015 to present - Vice President of - Maharashtra State Co-operative Textile Federation
 2013 to present - President of Adishakti Muktai Sahakari Soot Girni Ltd

References

Living people
Women in Maharashtra politics
Indian women bankers
People from Jalgaon district
Nationalist Congress Party politicians from Maharashtra
1982 births